The Albany and Northern Railway (A&N) began life in about 1895 on a  stretch of railway from Cordele to Albany, Georgia.  The line had originally been built around 1890 by the Albany, Florida and Northern Railway (AF&N). The AF&N was leased then to the Savannah, Americus and Montgomery Railway (SA&M) in 1892.  In 1895, the SA&M went bankrupt and the AF&N was then reorganized into the Albany and Northern Railway.

In 1910, the Georgia, Southwestern and Gulf Railroad (GS&G) leased the A&N with the goal of opening a line from Cordele to the Gulf Coast.  The GS&G ran into financial trouble and was dissolved in 1942 at which time the A&N ran independently again. The Southern Railway acquired the A&N and Georgia Northern Railway in 1966, and merged the former into the latter on December 31, 1971.

External links
 HawkinsRails.net Albany & Northern page

Defunct Georgia (U.S. state) railroads
Predecessors of the Southern Railway (U.S.)
Railway companies established in 1895
Railway companies disestablished in 1971
1895 establishments in Georgia (U.S. state)